The Clarence galaxias (Galaxias johnstoni) is a species of fish in the family Galaxiidae endemic to Tasmania.

Description
The Clarence galaxias is scaleless and has a dark brown back with brown bars and bands extending down its sides, while the belly is a lighter yellow-cream color. Adults reach a body length of 12.5–14 cm and a maximum weight of 20 g.

Distribution and habitat 
The Clarence galaxias is a freshwater species and inhabits lakes as well as swamps and streams connected to lakes. It is endemic to Tasmania's Derwent River catchment, including the Clarence Lagoon. Only seven breeding populations are currently known.

Conservation
While locally common, the species has been classified as endangered by the IUCN. It is under pressure from predation and competition from introduced brown trout and rainbow trout.

References

Clarence galaxias
Freshwater fish of Tasmania
River Derwent (Tasmania)
Critically endangered fauna of Australia
Clarence galaxias
Taxonomy articles created by Polbot